Each of the fifty states of the US plus many of its territories and the District of Columbia issued license plates for registered vehicles for the calendar year 1960.

In 1960, most states and territories issued plates that were valid for one year only and plates dated 1960 usually expired before December 31, though the expiration dates varied from state to state. A few states, such as New York, issued plates that could be renewed for at least one more year, subject to the payment to do so and the addition of a metal tab covering the original plate's expiration date and bearing the new year of expiration. Even fewer states issued multi-year plates that could be renewed annually using adhesive stickers. Only Massachusetts did not issue license plates dated 1960, instead revalidating 1959 plates with windshield stickers.

Passenger baseplates

Non-passenger plates

See also

Antique vehicle registration
Electronic license plate
Motor vehicle registration
Vehicle license

References

External links

1960
1960 in transport